Şeyhömer is a village Mersin Province, Turkey.

Geography
Şeyhömer is in Gülnar district of  Mersin Province. At  it is situated to the south of the road connecting Gülnar to west. The population of Şeyhömer was 559 as of 2012.

History
The Turkmen village was founded in the fourteenth century by a religious leader named Şeyh Ömer from Bukhara (a city in modern Uzbekistan).  Şeyh Ömer's tomb is in the village . There are also Roman age rock tombs around the village.

Economy
The village is also a yayla of Aydıncık residents who seek cooler places to spend the summers. The major economic activity is agriculture. Cereals as well as squash, bean and garbanzo are among the crops. Fruits are also produced.

Trivia
According to mythology Şeyh Ömer helped  Karamanoğlu sultan in capturing Mamure Castle.

References

Villages in Gülnar District
Yaylas in Turkey